Don Giovanni in Sicilia may refer to:

Don Giovanni in Sicilia (novel), a 1941 novel by Vitaliano Brancati
Don Juan in Sicily, a 1967 film by Alberto Lattuada based on Brancati's novel